Stochov is a town in Kladno District in the Central Bohemian Region of the Czech Republic. It has about 5,300 inhabitants.

Administrative parts
Vllages of Čelechovice and Honice are administrative parts of Stochov.

Etymology
According to legend, the name is derived from sto chův (i.e. "hundred nannies") and refers to nannies, who take care here of young Saint Wenceslaus. In fact, the name is derived from the personal name Stoch, who had a court here.

Geography
It lies in the geomorphological mesoregion of Džbán.

History
The first written mention of Stochov is from 1316. It used to be a small village until the second half of 20th century, when a large housing estate was built west of Stochov to accommodate the increasing number of people working in coal mines in the Kladno area in the 1950s and 1960s. Subsequently, Stochov gained town status in 1967.

Demographics

Transport

The town is located on a railway line leading from Prague to Kladno and Rakovník. There is a train station which is served by regional trains.

The D6 motorway runs next to the town.

Sights
According to legend, Saint Wenceslaus was born in Stochov and his grandmother Saint Ludmila then planted an oak tree to commemorate this event. The aged and half withered oak tree, estimated to be about 700–1,000 years old and called Saint Wenceslaus' Oak (Svatováclavský dub), is the main sight of the town, and is considered to be one of the oldest and most significant trees in the Czech Republic.

A sandstone statue of St. Wenceslaus from 1887 stands in front of the oak tree.

Twin towns – sister cities

Stochov is twinned with:
 Bourbon-Lancy, France
 Saarwellingen, Germany

References

External links

Cities and towns in the Czech Republic
Populated places in Kladno District